Joo Hyun-jae (born 26 May 1989) is a South Korean footballer who plays as a defender for FC Anyang in the K League 2.

External links 

1989 births
Living people
Association football defenders
South Korean footballers
Incheon United FC players
FC Anyang players
Ansan Mugunghwa FC players
Asan Mugunghwa FC players
K League 1 players
K League 2 players